Colin F. Bailey  (born 1967) is a researcher in structural engineering, who became the President and Principal of Queen Mary University of London in September 2017. Prior to that, Bailey was Deputy President and Deputy Vice-Chancellor at the University of Manchester. He is a Fellow of the Royal Academy of Engineering, the Institution of Civil Engineers, the Institution of Structural Engineers and a member of the Institution of Fire Engineers.

Early life and education
Bailey was born in Hillingdon in 1967. He left school at 16 to start work as an apprentice draughtsman at Lovell Construction. After completing his ONC, through day release and night school at Slough College, Bailey secured a job at Cameron Taylor Partners, where he become a professional draftsman and completed his HNC. After leaving Cameron Taylor Partners, Bailey worked for Clarke Nicholls Marcel where he designed a number of buildings within London. Aged 22, he began a degree in civil and structural engineering at the University of Sheffield, graduating with a first class BEng in 1992, followed by a PhD in 1995, and postdoctoral work in building fire safety.

Senior career
Following his studies at Bailey became a Senior Engineer at the Steel Construction Institute (SCI), carrying out consultancy, running CPD courses and developing design guides to support the steel industry.  He then joined the Building Research Establishment (BRE) as a Principal Engineer, carrying out consultancy, research and development, and design code development into all aspects of structural engineering and fire engineering.

Service and leadership
Bailey joined the University of Manchester in 2002 as Professor of Structural Engineering, and became Head of the School of Mechanical, Aerospace and Civil Engineering in 2007. His leadership achievements at Manchester include the launch of high-profile research projects, including the BP International Centre for Advanced Materials, the National Graphene Institute (£61m of funding support) and the Sir Henry Royce Institute (£283m of funding).

Bailey was appointed President and Principal of Queen Mary University of London in September 2017.

Bailey is currently a Trustee and Board Member of Universities UK (UUK), Universities and Colleges Admissions Service (UCAS) and the University of London. He is a Director and Board Member of Universities and Colleges Employers Association (UCEA), and a Non-Executive Director and Board Member of the Russell Group and UCL Partners. 

Previous Bailey has held Chair, Non-Executive Director or Trustee roles at Central Manchester University Hospitals NHS Foundation Trust (until 2017), ‘The Sir Bobby Charlton Foundation’ (2011-2017), The Northern Consortium Board (2010-2017), Knowledge Centre for Materials Chemistry (2012-2017), University of Manchester I3 (UMI3) Limited (2010-2016), University of Manchester Innovation Centre Limited (2010-2016). He was a member of the UPPF Student Futures Commission (2021-2022), the Manchester Internationalisation and Marketing Advisory Board (2015-2017), and the Manchester Museum of Science and Industry (MOSI) Advisory Board (2013-2017). He was also member of the UK Standing Committee on Structural Safety (2010-2014), and the Contract Management Board (2009-2013) of the UK's National Nuclear Laboratory (NNL). He was Patron of the Catalyst Science Discovery Centre (2014-2017).

Until 2015, Bailey was Chair of three spin-out companies: Graphene Lighting PLC, Graphene Security and BGT Materials.

For the Royal Academy of Engineering, Bailey has been a Trustee (2016-2019), Chair Panel 1 and Member of the Membership Committee (2013-2018) and Member of the Nominations Committee (2019-2022).

Research
Bailey is author of more than 130 research papers, conference papers and practical design guides, and has been awarded nine prizes for his research work. His main specialties are fire safety engineering of structures, membrane action, wind loading and steel-concrete composite systems.

Publications
Bailey is a published authority in the field of structural fire engineering and has published 10 practical fire design guides/books. This has included the publication of the ‘Bailey’ fire design method, which has been used in design software and distributed to 2,500 companies in 20 countries.

Recognition
In 2018, Bailey was awarded an Honorary Professorship by Northwestern Polytechnical University (NPU) in China.

Bailey was appointed Commander of the Order of the British Empire (CBE) in the 2020 New Year Honours for services to engineering.

Controversies and criticism

2020 Coronavirus Job Retention Scheme
Bailey was leading Queen Mary University of London during the Coronavirus pandemic in 2020 when the students’ union claimed that it had refused to allow them to access the UK government's Coronavirus Job Retention Scheme (CJRS) to claim more than their actual wage bill.  The University responded by indicating that the students' union was in fact prohibited by government guidelines from being able to claim more than their actual wage bill from the CJRS and that the University had committed to making sure that student workers were paid their expected wages. Students disagreed that this was an accurate representation of the guidelines.

Graphene shareholdings
Bailey is reported to have held substantial shareholdings in graphene-related companies that have led to accusations of potential conflicts of interest with his university administration roles. In 2016, the Sunday Times reported that Bailey had taken shares in Graphene Lighting, a spin-off from a company (BGT Materials) that held contracts with the National Graphene Institute during Bailey's time as deputy vice chancellor at the University of Manchester. Bailey denied that there had ever been a conflict of interest, and had resigned his directorships in the companies by December 2015.

In 2022, the University and College Union branch at Queen Mary University of London alleged that Bailey had not declared shareholdings in BGT Materials and Graphene Security in the university's register of interests, leading to the potential for a conflict of interest. A subsequent investigation by Queen Mary found there was no conflict of interest, with Companies House data showing that the shares have no financial value.

References 

1967 births
Living people
British civil engineers
Academics of Queen Mary University of London
Alumni of the University of Sheffield
Academics of the University of Manchester
British structural engineers
Date of birth missing (living people)
Commanders of the Order of the British Empire